Malik ibn al-Murahhal  or Abu l-Hakam/Abu l-Mayd Malik ibn Abd al-Rahman ibn Ali ibn Abd al-Rahman ibn (al-)Faray ibn (al-)Azraq ibb Saad/Munir ibn Salim ibn (al-)Faray al-Masmudi al-Malaqi al-Sabti (13 August 1207, in Málaga – 10 April 1299, in Fez) is considered to be one of the greatest Moroccan poets. He belonged to a Masmudi family and was born in Malaga, but grew up in Ceuta and was the chancellor of Marinid sultans like Abu Yusuf Yaqub.  He is the author of 24 books among which a panegyric of the Prophet in popular form.

References

Muhammad b. Jafar al-Kattani, Salwat al-anfas wa-muhadathat al-akyas bi-man uqbira min al-ulema wa-l-sulha bi-Fas, Lith., s vols, 1316, Fez, pp. 99–110
Abd al-Rahman b. Khaldun, Kitab al-Ibar wa-diwan al-mubtada wa-l-khabar fi ayyam al-Arab wa-l-Ajam wa-l-Barbar, Bulaq ed., VII, pp. 198–200
José Manuel Continete,  "Dos poemas de Malik B. Al-Murahhal, poeta malagueño al servicio de los benimerines",in: Awraq: Estudios sobre el mundo árabe e islámico contemporáneo, ISSN 0214-834X, Nº 2, 1979, pags. 44-54
 L. Gómez García, Biblioteca de al-Andalus, Volume IV, entry  "Ibn al-Murahhal"

1207 births
1299 deaths
13th-century Berber people
Berber Muslims
Berber poets
Berber writers
Masmuda
13th-century Moroccan poets
People from Fez, Morocco
People from Málaga
13th-century writers from al-Andalus
People from Ceuta